Han Duck-soo (born 18 June 1949) is a South Korean diplomat, economist, and politician serving as the 44th and current Prime Minister of South Korea since May 2022. Han is the fifth person to serve as the prime minister twice having served as the 34th Prime Minister under President Roh Moo-hyun from 2007 to 2008. He was the ambassador to the United States from 2009 to 2012. He served as Chairman of the Korea International Trade Association from 2012 to 2015.

Education 
Han graduated from Seoul National University with a bachelor's degree in economics in 1971. He received a master's degree in economics in 1979 and a doctorate in economics in 1984 from Harvard University.

Career 
His career spans over 35 years, starting at the National Tax Service in 1970 and the Economic Planning Board four years later. In 1982, he moved to what is now the Ministry of Trade, Industry and Energy, where he rose to Vice Minister in 1997–1998, during the Asian financial crisis; he later became Minister of Trade Affairs (1998–2000), handling trade negotiations with foreign governments.

Han subsequently became Minister of Finance of South Korea and served as Acting Prime Minister from 14 March 2006 to 19 April 2006. He resigned as Finance Minister in July 2006 and instead became a special presidential advisor for free trade agreement affairs.

On 9 March 2007, Han was nominated as Prime Minister by President Roh Moo-hyun following the resignation of Han Myeong-sook. His nomination was approved by the National Assembly on 2 April 2007. 

In 2022, Han became prime minister again at the age of 72 and 11 months, becoming the oldest person to take the office.

References 

1949 births
Living people
Ambassadors of South Korea to the United States
Cheongju Han clan
Deputy Prime Ministers of South Korea
Finance ministers of South Korea
Government ministers of South Korea
Harvard University alumni
Kyunggi High School alumni
People from Jeonju
Seoul National University alumni
South Korean diplomats
South Korean economists